En concert may refer to:

Albums
 En Concert (Mylène Farmer album), a 1989 live album by Mylène Farmer
 En Concert (Alizée album), a 2004 live album by Alizée
 En Concert Tour DVD
 En Concert (Jack Johnson album), a 2009 live album by Jack Johnson
 En Concert, a 2011 album by Calogero